AE series may refer to:

Keisei AE series (1972), operated 1973–1993
Keisei AE100 series, operated 1990–2016
Keisei AE series (2009), operated from 2010